Daniel 'Danny' Costello (born 1975) is a male retired boxer who competed for England.

Boxing career
Costello was three times National Champion in 1994, 1995 and 1996 after winning the prestigious ABA flyweight title, boxing out of the Hollington ABC.

He represented England and won a bronze medal in the flyweight (-51 kg) division, at the 1994 Commonwealth Games in Victoria, British Columbia, Canada.

He turned professional on 26 October 1996 and fought in 7 fights until 2004.

References

1975 births
English male boxers
Boxers at the 1994 Commonwealth Games
Commonwealth Games medallists in boxing
Commonwealth Games bronze medallists for England
Living people
Flyweight boxers
Medallists at the 1994 Commonwealth Games